Joshua David Lovelady (born January 28, 1978) is a former American football guard who played two seasons with the Detroit Lions of the National Football League. He played college football at the University of Houston and attended Tidehaven High School in Elmaton, Texas. He was also a member of the Scottish Claymores of NFL Europe. Lovelady was released by the Lions on September 1, 2004.

References

External links
Just Sports Stats

Living people
1978 births
Players of American football from Texas
American football offensive guards
Houston Cougars football players
Scottish Claymores players
Detroit Lions players
Sportspeople from Killeen, Texas